In mathematics, especially in the area of abstract algebra known as ring theory, a free algebra is the noncommutative analogue of a polynomial ring since its elements may be described as "polynomials" with non-commuting variables. Likewise, the polynomial ring may be regarded as a free commutative algebra.

Definition
For R a commutative ring, the free (associative, unital) algebra on n indeterminates {X1,...,Xn} is the free R-module with a basis consisting of all words over the alphabet {X1,...,Xn} (including the empty word, which is the unit of the free algebra). This R-module becomes an R-algebra by defining a multiplication as follows: the product of two basis elements is the concatenation of the corresponding words:

and the product of two arbitrary R-module elements is thus uniquely determined (because the multiplication in an R-algebra must be R-bilinear). This R-algebra is denoted R⟨X1,...,Xn⟩. This construction can easily be generalized to an arbitrary set X of indeterminates.

In short, for an arbitrary set , the free (associative, unital) R-algebra on X is 

with the R-bilinear multiplication that is concatenation on words, where X* denotes the free monoid on X (i.e. words on the letters Xi),  denotes the external direct sum, and Rw denotes the free R-module on 1 element, the word w.

For example, in R⟨X1,X2,X3,X4⟩, for scalars α, β, γ, δ ∈ R, a concrete example of a product of two elements is 

.

The non-commutative polynomial ring may be identified with the monoid ring over R of the free monoid of all finite words in the Xi.

Contrast with polynomials
Since the words over the alphabet {X1, ...,Xn} form a basis of R⟨X1,...,Xn⟩, it is clear that any element of R⟨X1, ...,Xn⟩ can be written uniquely in the form:

where  are elements of R and all but finitely many of these elements are zero. This explains why the elements of R⟨X1,...,Xn⟩ are often denoted as "non-commutative polynomials" in the "variables" (or "indeterminates") X1,...,Xn; the elements  are said to be "coefficients" of these polynomials, and the R-algebra R⟨X1,...,Xn⟩ is called the "non-commutative polynomial algebra over R in n indeterminates". Note that unlike in an actual polynomial ring, the variables do not commute. For example, X1X2 does not equal X2X1.

More generally, one can construct the free algebra R⟨E⟩ on any set E of generators. Since rings may be regarded as Z-algebras, a free ring on E can be defined as the free algebra Z⟨E⟩.

Over a field, the free algebra on n indeterminates can be constructed as the tensor algebra on an n-dimensional vector space.  For a more general coefficient ring, the same construction works if we take the free module on n generators.

The construction of the free algebra on E is functorial in nature and satisfies an appropriate universal property. The free algebra functor is left adjoint to the forgetful functor from the category of R-algebras to the category of sets.

Free algebras over division rings are free ideal rings.

See also

Cofree coalgebra
Tensor algebra
Free object
Noncommutative ring
Rational series

References
 
 

Algebras
Ring theory
Free algebraic structures